Mildred Blount (born 1907) was an American milliner noted for her creations for celebrities and people in high society.

Career
Blount's interest in millinery grew out of her time working at Madame Clair's Dress and Hat Shop in New York City. She and her sister, who was a dressmaker, opened their own dress and hat shop aimed at serving wealthy New Yorkers.

After Blount's designs were shown at the 1939 New York World's Fair,  her career took off. She was asked to design hats for the films Gone with the Wind and Easter Parade as well as for the cover of the August 1942 Ladies' Home Journal. Later in the 1940s, she ran a hat shop in Beverly Hills, California.
Her clients included Joan Crawford, Rosalind Russell, Gloria Vanderbilt, Marian Anderson, and others. 

She was the first African American member of the Motion Pictures Costumers Union, which allowed her to work in film studios.

Blount reportedly died in 1974 in Los Angeles, California.

References

External links
 Mildred Blount covered in In Her Footsteps by Annette Madden.
 Photo of Mildred Blount with Gloria Vanderbilt in the September 1992 Ebony magazine.
 Hats designed by Mildred Blount held at the California African American Museum.

1907 births
1974 deaths
African-American fashion designers
American fashion designers
American milliners
20th-century African-American women
20th-century African-American people
American women fashion designers